David Borg is an entertainment producer who lives in Toronto.

Biography
Borg graduated from Canada's now defunct National Institute of Broadcasting. Borg worked from 1996 into 2006 as a production executive.

Borg is excuctive producer of the movie Supercross: The Movie / Supercross. China and much of Asia have embraced the theatrical release, where Supercross: The Movie has been one of the most popular U.S films lately.

Movie & TV Productions
 Red Riding Hood (2006) .... Executive Producer
 Popstar (2005) .... Co-Executive Producer
 Supercross (2005) .... Executive Producer
 Hansel & Gretel (2002) .... Co-Executive Producer
 The Santa Trap (2002) (TV) ... Co-Executive Producer
 The Retrievers (2001) (TV) ....
 No Place Like Home (2001) ....

References

Hollywood.com reference of David Borg with Filmography and TV Credits.
David Borg named president and CEO of Creator Capital in article at   BNET
 David Borg referenced at  Creator Capital

External links

David Borg listed at AOL.com moviefone 
David Borg listed at MSN.com movies 
David Borg mentioned at About.com as the executive producer of Supercross 
David Borg featured at the Greater Vancouver International Film Festival Society article in The Film & Television Trade Forum 

Living people
American film producers
Year of birth missing (living people)
Place of birth missing (living people)

ja:エグゼクティブプロデューサー
zh:執行製作